Brown Derby was a chain of restaurants in Los Angeles, California.

Brown Derby may also refer to:
 Brown Derby (actor), Scottish actor
 Brown Derby (cocktail)
 Brown Derby (liquor company), the chain of liquor stores
 The Brown Derby (film), a 1926 American silent comedy film